Duplicaria crakei is a species of sea snail, a marine gastropod mollusk in the family Terebridae, the auger snails.

Description

Distribution
This marine species occurs off Australia.

References

 Burch, R. D., 1965. New Terebrid Species from the Indo-Pacific Ocean and from the Gulf of Mexico, with New Locality Records and Provisional Lists of Soecies Collected in Western Australia and Sabah, Malaysia. The Veliger 7(4): 241-253

Terebridae
Gastropods described in 1965